Dr Graham Renshaw FRSE FZS LRCP (1872–1952) was a 20th-century British physician and noted biologist. He was editor of the "Avicultural Magazine" from 1917 to August 1920 and editor of "Natureland".

Life
Renshaw studied Medicine at the University of Manchester graduating MB.

In 1914 he was elected a Fellow of the Royal Society of Edinburgh. His proposers were Herbert Bolton, William Evans Hoyle, Robert Kidston and James Hartley Ashworth. He practiced medicine in Manchester and taught Zoology as an extramural subject at the University of Manchester.

He was Vice President of the Manchester Medical Society.

Renshaw published several books and many articles, for instance in The Zoologist.

He died on 13 January 1952.

Publications

 The Avicultural Magazine.
  
  
  
 Natural History Essays. London : Sheratt & Hughes (1904)
 More Natural History Essays. London : Sheratt & Hughes (1905)
Bird Life at Manchester Zoo (1920)

References

1872 births
1952 deaths
Alumni of the University of Manchester
British zoologists
Fellows of the Royal Society of Edinburgh